Mont Fort is a mountain of the Pennine Alps, located near Verbier in the Swiss canton of Valais. It lies on the range between the valleys of Bagnes and Nendaz, north of the Rosablanche.

Mont Fort is surrounded by several glaciers, the largest being the Glacier de Tortin, on its northwestern side. The second largest is the Glacier du Mont Fort, located on its northeastern side. On its eastern side lies the lower summit Petit Mont Fort. The Glacier du Petit Mont Fort lies between the two summits. There are no glaciers on the south side of the mountain. A small lake named Lac du Petit Mont Fort lies on the south flank.

The summit of Mont Fort is easily accessible by cable car from the heights of Verbier or Nendaz. In the winter and early spring season, the mountain, including the Glacier de Tortin, is the culminating point of the 4 Vallées ski area, accessible by the "Mont-Fort" cable car. There is one ski slope leading down from the mountain's peak - which then leads down to the Col des Gentianes, where a restaurant and two cable cars leading down to Verbier and Siviez (Haute-Nendaz) are situated.

Accessibility 
As above, the mountain is accessible from the '4 Vallées' ski area, made up of La Tzoumaz, Verbier, Haute-Nendaz, Veysonnaz and Thyon, each interconnected with ski lifts, managed by each ski resort's separate lift operators (apart from Nendaz & Veysonnaz, who have recently merged their lift operators to form 'NVRM'). Mont-Fort lies between the Verbier and Nendaz (both of which are easily accessible by road).

See also
List of mountains of Switzerland accessible by public transport
Verbier - http://verbier.ch
Nendaz - http://nendaz.ch
4 Vallées - http://4vallees.ch
mySwitzerland - http://myswitzerland.ch

References

External links

Mont Fort on Hikr

Mountains of the Alps
Alpine three-thousanders
Mountains of Valais
Cable cars in Switzerland
Bagnes
Mountains of Switzerland